Arhopala epimete, the violetdisc oakblue, is a species of butterfly belonging to the lycaenid family described by Otto Staudinger in 1889. It is found in Southeast Asia (Borneo, Palawan, Burma, Mergui, Langkawi, Peninsular Malaya and Sumatra).

Subspecies
Arhopala epimete epimete (Borneo, Palawan)
Arhopala epimete duessa Doherty, 1889 (southern Burma, Mergui, Langkawi)
Arhopala epimete suedas Corbet, 1941 (Peninsular Malaysia, possibly Sumatra)
Arhopala epimete magindana Osada, 1987 (Philippines: north-eastern Mindanao)

References

Arhopala
Butterflies described in 1889
Butterflies of Asia
Taxa named by Otto Staudinger